is a Japanese voice actress and singer from Kawagoe, Saitama. She is known for her role as Kanan Matsuura from Love Live! Sunshine!!.

Biography
Suwa was inspired to become a voice actress after watching the anime Hidamari Sketch. She later debuted as a voice actress in 2013. She hosted an internet radio program on A&G+ as a unit called "Urumeitsu Junior." On April 8, 2015, she officially joined the talent office Amuleto.

In the same year, she joined the multimedia franchise Love Live! Sunshine!! as Kanan Matsuura and became a member of Aqours. The character is her first role as a main character, and during the audition, she already aimed to become Kanan's voice actress. She is nicknamed "Suwawa" by both fans and Aqours members.

In 2017, Suwa's agency Amuleto prohibited the reproducing of her photos from various official sources. This is most likely to prevent any more impostor incidents, which she had mentioned a few days before.

On March 31, 2021, Suwa announced that she would be leaving Amuleto.

Works

Anime
World War Blue (2013) as Yaya
Typhoon Noruda (2015) as Otenba
Love Live! Sunshine!! (2016–2017) as Kanan Matsuura
Sabapara (2016) as Miyo
PJ Berry no Mogumogu Munyamunya (2016) as Sunny Funny
Gabriel DropOut (2017) as customer
Bofuri (2020) as Yui
Management of a Novice Alchemist (2022) as Kate Starven
Genjitsu no Yohane: Sunshine in the Mirror (2023) as Kanan Matsuura

Anime films
Idol Bu Show (2022) as Risa Umino

Video games
Love Live! School Idol Festival as Kanan Matsuura
Love Live! School Idol Festival All Stars as Kanan Matsuura
Epic Seven as Free Spirit Tieria, Helga, Azalea
Relayer as Eight

Discography

Studio albums

References

External links
 Official music website 
 Official agency profile 

1994 births
Living people
Aqours members
Japanese women pop singers
Japanese video game actresses
Japanese voice actresses
Voice actresses from Saitama Prefecture
People from Kawagoe, Saitama
21st-century Japanese actresses
21st-century Japanese singers
21st-century Japanese women singers